Pajarito is a town and municipality in the La Libertad Province, part of the Colombian department of Boyacá. The municipality, situated in the southeast of the department borders Labranzagrande and Aquitania of the department of Boyacá and Yopal, Recetor and Aguazul of the department of Casanare. The centre is experiencing periodic landslides.

Etymology 
The name Pajarito in Spanish means "little bird", yet the origin of the name is thought to be from Chibcha: Pa is "father", ja; "load, role", rito; "dog".

Geology 
The area of Pajarito is characterized by an intrusive complex into the surrounding Lower Cretaceous sediments (Macanal Formation). The petrology of the igneous body is alkaline to sub-alkaline and low in SiO2. Secondary minerals are apatite and hydrothermal chlorite.

History 
The first inhabitants of the village may have been indigenous people of the Golconda tribe, short in stature and bandy-legged. The Golcondenses were cultivators of maize and hunters. They spoke a version of Chibcha, giving rise to the name of the town.

Modern Pajarito was founded on January 1, 1853 by soldiers of Gran Colombia. The first mayors were military men.

Economy 
Pajarito is a rural community centered around agriculture and livestock farming. Main agricultural products cultivated in the municipality are coffee, maize, sugarcane, yuca, beans and potatoes. Hot springs are present outside the urban centre.

Climate
Pajarito has a tropical monsoon climate (Am) with moderate to little rainfall from December to March and heavy to very heavy rainfall in the remaining months.

References

Bibliography 
 

Municipalities of Boyacá Department
Populated places established in 1853